The Oregon City Masonic Lodge, also known as Masonic Temple Multnomah No. 1, is an historic building in Oregon City, Oregon, United States. The Masonic building went on the market in 2012.

References

External links
 

Buildings and structures in Oregon City, Oregon
Former Masonic buildings in Oregon